James Robson (1860–1934) was a British trade unionist.

Born in West Auckland, County Durham, Robson started work at the age of ten.  In 1890, he was elected checkweighman at Broompark Colliery, then later moved to Bearpark Colliery.  In 1917, he was elected President of the Durham Miners' Association, serving until his death in 1934.  From 1918 to 1921, he also served as Treasurer of the Miners' Federation of Great Britain.  He was a member of the Methodist New Connexion.

References

1860 births
1934 deaths
British trade union leaders
People from West Auckland